Jamestown is a town in Guilford County, North Carolina, United States. It is a suburb of the nearby cities of Greensboro and High Point. The population was 3,382 at the 2010 census.

Geography
Jamestown is located in southwestern Guilford County at  (35.998221, -79.935733). It is bordered to the west by the city of High Point.

Transportation
Interstate 74 bypasses the town, giving the town access to Winston-Salem, Asheboro, and Rockingham. Lexington Road, Greensboro Road, and Main Street all connect the town to Greensboro and High Point. The Jamestown Parkway is a limited-access highway that effectively bypasses Greensboro Road and Main Street, also serving as one of the main routes connecting Greensboro to High Point. The route is mainly four-lanes while having at-grade intersections and grade-separations, though with only one street crossing over the parkway. The route has no actual interchanges with other roads in the town compared to similarly-built routes in the state.

The Deep River, a tributary of the Cape Fear River, flows through the southern part of the town.

Demographics

2020 census

As of the 2020 United States census, there were 3,668 people, 1,812 households, and 1,219 families residing in the town.

2000 census
As of the census of 2000, there were 3,088 people, 1,229 households, and 924 families residing in the town. The population density was 1,159.0 people per square mile (448.2/km2). There were 1,293 housing units at an average density of 485.3 per square mile (187.7/km2). The racial makeup of the town was 86.79% White, 7.97% African American, 0.19% Native American, 2.40% Asian, 0.74% from other races, and 0.91% from two or more races. Hispanic or Latino of any race were 2.04% of the population.

There were 1,229 households, out of which 33.7% had children under the age of 18 living with them, 64.3% were married couples living together, 8.5% had a female householder with no husband present, and 24.8% were non-families. 20.1% of all households were made up of individuals, and 6.9% had someone living alone who was 65 years of age or older. The average household size was 2.51 and the average family size was 2.90.

In the town, the population was spread out, with 24.4% under the age of 18, 7.4% from 18 to 24, 27.8% from 25 to 44, 27.9% from 45 to 64, and 12.6% who were 65 years of age or older. The median age was 40 years. For every 100 females, there were 96.4 males. For every 100 females age 18 and over, there were 92.1 males.

The median income for a household in the town was $107,331, and the median income for a family was $77,549. Males had a median income of $58,889 versus $35,771 for females. The per capita income for the town was $29,689. About 4.5% of families and 5.3% of the population were below the poverty line, including 6.9% of those under age 18 and 1.3% of those age 65 or over.

History

The Keyauwee
As early as 1701, the Keyauwee people were living in a village in this region. They enjoyed the area's mild climate, abundant natural resources, and the fertile hunting grounds along the Deep and Uwharrie rivers.

Part of a loose confederacy of 20 or more tribes, it is believed that by the 1760s, the Keyauwee had moved south, close to the boundary between the two Carolinas, where they were likely absorbed by the Catawba tribe.

Quaker settlement
By the late 18th century, European settlers came to Jamestown. Many were Quaker families who moved to the area from Pennsylvania in search of productive farmland. Among the original settlers was James Mendenhall, who established a farmstead near present-day Jamestown in 1762. Though Mendenhall moved to Georgia in 1775, his son George remained, and by 1816, he founded the village of Jamestown in honor of his father.

The Mendenhall family, who owned and operated the area's first grist and lumber mills, also owned much of the town's original land. Today, High Point City Lake is situated where the original family farmhouse and land was located.

In 1781, during the Revolutionary War, British General Cornwallis' army camped near the settlement and commandeered provisions from local farms and mills prior to his engagement with Nathanael Greene's troops at New Garden, in modern-day Greensboro.

19th century

By 1800, Jamestown was a bustling settlement of 150 residents with its own post office, inn and Freemasons' lodge. Around this same time, gold was discovered near Jamestown, and several mines profited until the California Gold Rush frenzy shut down local efforts.

In 1811, James Mendenhall's son Richard, a local tanner, built the Mendenhall Plantation homestead, a highlight of any tour of Jamestown today.

In addition to farming and related industries, Jamestown was home to a gun factory, which manufactured a sturdy and accurate muzzle-loading gun known as the "Jamestown Rifle", the mainstay of Jamestown's industry through the latter half of the 19th century and a highly prized collectible among gun enthusiasts today.

During the Civil War, Jamestown's Quakers, who opposed war and violence, attempted to remain neutral. However, the Confederacy demanded that those who were able to make shoes, uniforms, or weapons continue to do so or pay heavy taxes. Records indicate that Confederate President Jefferson Davis and his entourage passed through Jamestown during their hasty retreat to the south after the Civil War ended.

Prior to the war, Jamestown was a known "stop" along the Underground Railroad, which helped fugitive slaves reach freedom in the North. According to local historical records, many Quaker homes in this area had a trap door leading to the basement to help slaves escape. Further, according to records, the Mendenhall and Beard families were instrumental in assisting in emancipation efforts.

Built in 1856, the railroad bisects Jamestown, and still provides a vital link for freight and some passengers between the port cities to the east and interior destinations.

20th century
By April 1947, the North Carolina General Assembly granted Jamestown incorporation. Several months after incorporation, Jamestown adopted zoning districts and began construction of a municipal water and sewer system.

T. C. Ragsdale Sr. served as the town's first mayor, and Charles P. Turner was the first town manager.

In the 1950s, with a population of approximately 750, the town boasted such improvements as street lighting, water and sewer service, and a fire department.

During the 1960s, Jamestown grew quickly. Several residential neighborhoods sprang from old farmland. An ABC board was formed and a liquor store was constructed, enabling the town to pay off debt incurred for water and sewer lines as well as fund the building of Town Hall in 1967 and the Jamestown Park and Golf Course in 1974.

The Former Jamestown High School, Gardner House, Jamestown Historic District, McCulloch's Gold Mill, Richard Mendenhall Plantation Buildings, Oakdale Cotton Mill Village, and Ragsdale Farm are listed on the National Register of Historic Places.

Education
In 1907 the North Carolina General Assembly enacted a law providing for the creation and maintenance of public high schools in each county. Jamestown Public School, a union school, was built and became the "best equipped school" in Guilford County, with dormitories for boarding students. In 1914 the school was destroyed by fire, but a new building was completed the next year. This building now stands in the heart of Jamestown and houses the Jamestown Public Library.

The school grew steadily, and a new high school complex in Jamestown was opened in September 1959. The new high school was named for Lucy Coffin Ragsdale because of her dedication and interest to public school education in Jamestown. The first principal of Ragsdale High School was T.G. Madison, followed by Steve Dalton. Kathryn Rogers was the third principal in the history of the school. Ragsdale is one of 26 high schools in Guilford County Schools. The areas that are zoned to Ragsdale's district include areas of northeastern High Point, southeast Jamestown, and the Adams Farm/Sedgefield area of Greensboro. The school's current principal is Jim Gibson.

Millis Road Elementary School opened in the fall of 1961. The first enrollment included 360 students, 12 teachers, a part-time librarian, and one principal. The intent of it being built was to relieve overcrowding in the Jamestown district. Even though the school originally had a capacity for 560 students, it at one time served a student body of 792. When the neighboring Pilot Elementary opened in the fall of 1996, the student body decreased to 330. Current enrollment is 515 students.

A variety of organizational patterns have been tried at the school, beginning with first through sixth grade, later third through fifth grade and the present pre-K through fifth grade. Millis Road students are participating in seminars led by teachers and specialists using Paidela techniques and methods. Millis Road is located in District 5 of the Guilford County School System.

To compensate for the town's growth, Jamestown has since built two more elementary schools and one more middle school. A community college, Guilford Technical Community College, provides local adults with a higher education.

Notable people
Mark Dixon, former NFL offensive lineman
Mary Mendenhall Hobbs, advocate for women's education, temperance, and suffrage
Pat McCrory, served as the 74th Governor of North Carolina from 2013 to 2017
Siri Mullinix, keeper for the 2000 U.S. women's Olympic soccer team
Paul Martin Newby, North Carolina Supreme Court justice
Larry Ogunjobi, NFL defensive tackle
Rayveness, pornographic actress
Kasey Redfern, former NFL punter
Clyde Simms, former MLS player
Pep Young, former MLB player

Climate
The climate in this area is characterized by relatively high temperatures and evenly distributed precipitation throughout the year.  According to the Köppen Climate Classification system, Jamestown has a Humid subtropical climate, abbreviated "Cfa" on climate maps.

See also
Jamestown News

References

External links
 
 Jamestown Public Library

Towns in Guilford County, North Carolina
Towns in North Carolina
Populated places established in 1762
Populated places on the Underground Railroad